Abdul Momin Talukdar (1929–1995) was a Bangladeshi Awami League politician, lawyer and former member of parliament and the former Deputy Minister of Local Government, Rural Development and Cooperative.

Early life
Talukdar was born on 1 September 1929 in Belkuchi, Pabna, East Bengal. He graduated from Pabna Edward College and went to law school in Dhaka University. Starting his career from Pabna district bar.

Career
Talukdar started politics during his student life in the Purba Bangla Chhatra League. he was involved in the language movement of 1952. He was the convener of All Party State Language Movement of Dhaka University. He is a former vice president of Pabna district Awami League. He was elected to Pakistan National Assembly in 1970 from the Awami League.

During the Bangladesh liberation war in 1971 he served as the motivation officer in the Mukti bahini training camp. He visited Nepal as a representative of Mujibnagar government to garner support for the Independence of Bangladesh. After the Independence of Bangladesh, he was elected to Parliament of Bangladesh in 1973. He served as the Deputy Minister of the Ministry of Local Government, Rural Development and Co-operatives in the Awami League government.

Death
Talukdar died on 15 August 1995 in Dhaka.

References

Awami League politicians
1929 births
1995 deaths
Mukti Bahini personnel
1st Jatiya Sangsad members
Pabna Edward College alumni
Bangladesh Krishak Sramik Awami League central committee members